The Beatles Bootleg Recordings 1963 is a compilation album of 59 previously unreleased recordings by English rock band the Beatles, released on 17 December 2013, exclusively through the iTunes Store. While it was initially only available for a few hours, it later became available again for purchase. The release was timed to extend the copyright of the 1963 recordings under EU law by 20 years – the EU protects recordings for 70 years only if they are formally released.

Composition
The album includes 15 studio outtakes and 42 live BBC Radio tracks, adding to those released previously on the albums Live at the BBC (1994) and On Air – Live at the BBC Volume 2 (2013). The album also includes John Lennon's demo recordings of "Bad to Me" and "I'm in Love", later released as singles by Billy J. Kramer and the Dakotas and the Fourmost, respectively.

Track listing
Tracks 1–14 are stereo; the rest are mono.

See also
 1963 in music
 The Beatles bootleg recordings
 The 50th Anniversary Collection, 2012 compilation of Bob Dylan recordings also released to prevent recordings from entering the public domain
 Ashcan copy, comic book industry term for a work published solely for copyright purposes

References

2013 compilation albums
2013 live albums
Albums produced by George Martin
BBC Radio recordings
Compilation albums published posthumously
ITunes-exclusive releases
Live albums published posthumously
The Beatles compilation albums
The Beatles live albums
Universal Records compilation albums
Universal Records live albums
Copyright extension compilation albums